Chabab Ben Guerir is a Moroccan football club currently playing in the second division. Club Jeunesse Ben Guerir (CJBG) was founded in 1952 and is located in the town of Ben Guerir, Morocco. They play in the Stade Municipal Ben Guerir.

References

External links
 – Soccerway.com

Football clubs in Morocco
1952 establishments in Morocco
Sports clubs in Morocco